Solidarity Alliance of Georgia is a political party in Georgia established on June 7, 2020, by the six Independent Members of the Parliament of Georgia and the Tbilisi City Council, which include Mariam Jashi, Beka Natsvlishvili, Levan Gogichaishvili, Zviad Kvachantiradze, Gedevan Popkhadze and Jaba Jishkariani.

History 
Solidarity Alliance of Georgia party was created on June 7, 2020, by independent MPs who left the majority during 2019 due to a fundamental disagreement on a number of issues. The most notorious of these issues were the issue of the selection of Supreme Court judges and the fall of the constitutional reform by the ruling party in November 2019 regarding the proportional electoral system.

After the fall of constitutional amendment, the Independent Deputies formed the new faction "Independent Lawmakers" on November 28, 2019, which initially consisted of 6 members. Mariam Jashi, chairwoman of the "Independent Lawmakers" faction, took part in the political dialogue between the ruling party and the opposition in February–March 2020. This political dialogue ended with the March 8 agreement on better electoral conditions for political parties and a less polarized environment.
5 Members of faction "Independent Lawmakers" later became the founders of the Solidarity Alliance of Georgia.

The party held its first convention on June 7, during which delegates approved the election of Beka Natsvlishvili as chairman of the party, Zviad Kvachantiradze as chairman of the political council and Mariam Jashi as secretary-general of the party. Additionally, the party's name was approved both in Georgian and English.

Political views 

The founders of the political party and their partners from scientific and professional communities and representatives of the Georgian society are united with a common vision to establish a country of freedom, justice and strong political institutions.

The party has the vision that values and respects the knowledge, labour and potential of every citizen and is based on the values of social justice, solidarity, economic prosperity, accelerations of Georgia’s Euro-Atlantic integration and strengthening of the democracy and sovereignty of the country.

According to the party, the state should not be a system of repression, but the main mechanism of universal development. Party members believe that a strong and just state based on the principle of solidarity serves the interests not of the units but of society as a whole. The founders of Solidarity Alliance of Georgia think that a polarized society in Georgia needs consolidation, solidarity and humanism.

According to the party members, they will always contribute to closing the page of the country's 30-year political history, which is full of personal controversies, and to establish more content and reasoning in the interests of the people in Georgian politics, which they believe will change the public's nihilism towards politicians.

The Solidarity Alliance of Georgia is running for 2020 Parliamentary elections and is planning to nominate candidates of Majoritarian MPs in all 30 electoral districts.

References

External links
 
 Faction "Independent Members of Parliament" on website of Parliament

Political parties established in 2020
Political parties in Georgia (country)
Pro-European political parties in Georgia (country)